The Telegraphist is a 1993 Norwegian film directed by Erik Gustavson. It is based on the novel Dreamers by Knut Hamsun. It stars Bjørn Floberg and Marie Richardson, as well as Kjersti Holmen, who won an Amanda for her role. The film was also entered into the 43rd Berlin International Film Festival. The film was selected as the Norwegian entry for the Best Foreign Language Film at the 66th Academy Awards, but was not accepted as a nominee.

Cast
 Bjørn Floberg as Ove Rolandsen
 Marie Richardson as Elise Mack
 Jarl Kulle as Mack
 Ole Ernst as Kaptein Henriksen
 Kjersti Holmen as Jomfru Van Loos
 Bjørn Sundquist as Levion
  as Pastor's Wife
 Svein Sturla Hungnes as Pastor
 Camilla Strøm-Henriksen as Olga
 Johan H:son Kjellgren as Fredrik
 Knut Haugmark as Enok
 Reidar Sørensen as Ulrik
 Maria Bonnevie as Pernille
 Jon Eivind Gullord as the new telegraph operator

See also
 List of submissions to the 66th Academy Awards for Best Foreign Language Film
 List of Norwegian submissions for the Academy Award for Best Foreign Language Film

References

External links

1993 films
1990s Norwegian-language films
1993 drama films
Films directed by Erik Gustavson
Films based on Norwegian novels
Films based on works by Knut Hamsun
Norwegian drama films